Age of Silence is a Norwegian avant-garde progressive metal band formed in 2004 by Andy Winter of Winds.

Discography

Full-lengths 
 Acceleration (The End Records) (2004)

EPs 
 Complications - Trilogy of Intricacy (The End Records) (2005)

Band members

Current members 
 Lars Are Nedland (Solefald, Borknagar, Ásmegin, Carpathian Forest) - Vocals
 Jan Axel von Blomberg (Arcturus, Dimmu Borgir, The Kovenant, Mayhem, Shining, Winds) - Drums
 BP M. Kirkevaag (Madder Mortem) - Guitars
 Andy Winter (Winds, Sculptured, Subterranean Masquerade) - Keyboards

Former members 
 Lars Eric Si (Winds, Before the Dawn, Khold, Tulus) - Bass, backing/extreme vocals
 Joacim Solheim - Guitars
 Helge Haugen - Guitars

External links 
 Official Age of Silence website

Norwegian avant-garde metal musical groups
Norwegian progressive metal musical groups
Musical groups established in 2004
2004 establishments in Norway
Musical groups from Oslo